Matthias Ecke (born 12 April 1983) is a German politician who has been serving as a Member of the European Parliament for the Social Democratic Party since 2022.

References

See also 

 List of members of the European Parliament for Germany, 2019–2024

1983 births
Living people
MEPs for Germany 2019–2024
Social Democratic Party of Germany MEPs
21st-century German politicians